Christopher Erb (born June 19, 1972) was the Vice President of Brand Marketing at EA SPORTS and the Executive Vice President of Brand Marketing at Legendary Pictures. Erb is currently the Managing Partner of tripleclix.

Career
Born in Waverly, New York and raised in Seattle, Washington, Erb is a graduate of the University of Washington. He is best known for his work at EA SPORTS, building its partnership marketing group. 
Erb began his career in the video game industry in 2000 as a Brand Manager at Wizards of the Coast. While there, he oversaw the development and launches of the Neopets Trading Card Game  and the Star Wars Trading Card Game. He also contributed to two MLB Showdown and two NFL Showdown TCG expansions in 2002, as well as the Pokémon and Dungeons & Dragons franchises.

Erb joined EA SPORTS in 2005 as the Senior Director of Marketing for the Madden NFL franchise. While leading the launch of Madden NFL from '06 to '09, he helped redefine the way popular video game franchises are launched and marketed, mirroring that of major theatrical releases.  This transition in marketing strategy spawned the events Maddenoliday and Maddenpalooza, both of which reinforced the notion that the annual release date of Madden NFL is a day worth celebrating for gamers. The latter of these events - Maddenpalooza - was held in the Rose Bowl in Pasadena, California.   Erb and his team's work on Madden NFL 07 and 08 was awarded back to back MI6 Best Overall Marketing Campaign Silver Awards. The Madden NFL titles from 2006 to 2009 remain as four of the top 25 selling sports video games of all time in North America.

In 2010, Erb became Vice President of Brand Marketing. In this capacity, he has helped guide the EA SPORTS brand beyond the console through strategic partnerships and licensing deals. In 2011, EA SPORTS opened retail locations in 3 airports across the country (Salt Lake City, Oklahoma City and Charlotte). In addition to airport stores, EA SPORTS opened its first sports bar in a partnership with Carnival Cruise Lines. In early 2012, EA SPORTS opened another bar location at the Cosmopolitan Hotel in Las Vegas.   Both bars allow consumers to play EA SPORTS titles on the bar televisions. For his work in this role, he was named to the 2011 iMedia 25 List of Internet Marketing Leaders and Advertisers.

Since 2010, Erb has managed partnerships between EA SPORTS' most popular video game franchises and numerous brands, including McDonald's, Nike, Doritos, Susan G. Komen, Louisiana Hot Sauce, and Coors Light. These partnerships have included everything from custom promotional packaging to full product line extensions, including custom gaming headsets created in partnership with Monster and Madden NFL flavored chips by Doritos.  Other partnerships have included those with professional sports leagues, including a weekly gaming tour that traveled with and mirrored NFL games.

In 2012, Erb was announced as one of Brand Innovators' "40 Under 40", a recognition of his team's work to transform EA SPORTS into a lifestyle brand that interacts socially with its consumers year round.   The list, compiled annually, recognizes the achievements of brand marketers in digital media and emerging advertising technologies.

While in his role at EA SPORTS, Erb gave talks about brand marketing's future in the digital age. In this capacity, he was the keynote speaker at Ad:Tech Sydney in 2012.  Erb also spoke at Tedx Cincy and Business Insider's 2012 Social Media ROI Conference.

In 2013, Erb joined Legendary Pictures as EVP of Brand Marketing. In his role, Erb was responsible for rebuilding the overall brand architecture and developing strategic programs that elevated Legendary's consumer brand awareness.

In 2014, Erb returned to the video game industry and co-founded a strategic marketing agency named tripleclix. tripleclix has been built off Erb's previous video game experience to build brand and studio relations for the benefit of gamers. The only specialized video game centric marketing agency of its kind, tripleclix is the connective tissue through which studios, brands, and gamers interact. With an initial team of additional employees tripleclix quickly won the trust, and business, of video game console maker Xbox. tripleclix has grown under Erb's leadership into a team of a half-dozen employees and over a dozen clients. In the short time that tripleclix has existed it has already won several marketing awards, including a Game Marketing Award  and a Clio.

tripleclix, though still fully focused on game marketing, continues to branch out into new markets, producing television broadcasting and producing music soundtracks.

Personal life
On August 14, 2007, the launch date of Madden NFL 08, Erb was struck by a car in Times Square while walking home from the official Madden NFL Launch Event. After several months in the hospital, he returned to work on November 1, 2007. Erb served on the Board of Directors for the ACLU of Southern California in a fundraising capacity from 2008-2012. Erb currently serves as a member of the Brand Innovators Advisory Board which he has been a part of since 2010.

Video game credits
Erb has worked on numerous video game titles throughout his career, most notably:
 Madden NFL 06
 Madden NFL 07
 Madden NFL 08
 Madden NFL 09
 NFL Head Coach
 NFL Street 3
 NFL Tour
 NASCAR 09

References

External links 
Christopher Erb's Twitter Page
tripleclix's Twitter Page

1972 births
Living people
People from Orlando, Florida
American marketing people
People from Waverly, Tioga County, New York